Herbert Doddington (died 1633) was an English politician who sat in the House of Commons from 1626 to 1629.

Doddington was the son of Sir William Doddington  of Breamore House Hampshire and his wife  Mary Herbert daughter of Sir John Herbert  of Neath Abbey, Castell-nedd, Glamorganshire.

In 1626, Doddington was elected Member of Parliament for Lymington. He was re-elected MP for Lymington in 1628 and sat until 1629 when King Charles decided to rule without parliament for eleven years.  On his marriage in 1629 his father settled on him the estate of South Charford, but he died in 1633.
 
Doddington married  Elizabeth Colles, daughter of John Colles in 1629, but they had no children.

References

Year of birth missing
1633 deaths
English MPs 1626
English MPs 1628–1629
Members of the Parliament of England (pre-1707) for Lymington